Khalid Latif may refer to:

Khalid Latif (imam), imam of the New York University Islamic Center and the New York City Police Department
Khalid Latif (cricketer) (born 1985), Pakistani cricketer
K. L. Gauba, also known as Khalid Latif Gauba (1889-1981), lawyer, author, politician